Mammaglobin is a gene that encodes a 10-kilodalton glycoprotein. In humans expression of the gene is limited to the adult mammary gland, a correlation between increased expression of the gene and breast cancer has been reported.

References

Glycoproteins
Breast anatomy